The 1969 edition of the Campeonato Carioca kicked off on March 8, 1969 and ended on June 22, 1969. It was organized by FCF (Federação Carioca de Futebol, or Carioca Football Federation). Twelve teams participated. Fluminense won the title for the 19th time. no teams were relegated.

System
The tournament would be divided in two stages:
 First round: The twelve teams all played in a single round-robin format against each other. The eight best teams qualified to the Second round.
 Final phase: The remaining eight teams all played in a single round-robin format against each other. The team with the most points won the title.

Championship

First round

Final round

Taça Guanabara

First round

Second round

Final standings

References

Campeonato Carioca seasons
Carioca